The 2016 Kazakhstan First Division was the 22nd edition of Kazakhstan First Division, the second level football competition in Kazakhstan.

Teams

Stadia and locations

Regular season

Regular season table

Regular season results

Championship round

Championship round table

Championship round results

Relegation round

Relegation round table

Relegation round results

Promotion play-offs

Altai Semey were promoted to the 2017 Kazakhstan Premier League; Taraz were relegated to the 2017 Kazakhstan First Division.

External links
Professional Football League of Kazakhstan official website 

Kazakhstan First Division seasons
2
Kazakhstan
Kazakhstan